
Gmina Działoszyce is an urban-rural gmina (administrative district) in Pińczów County, Świętokrzyskie Voivodeship, in south-central Poland.

The gmina contains part of the protected area called Kozubów Landscape Park.

Villages
Apart from the town of Działoszyce, Gmina Działoszyce contains the villages and settlements of Biedrzykowice, Bronocice, Bronów, Chmielów, Dębiany, Dębowiec, Dziekanowice, Dzierążnia, Dziewięczyce, Gaik, Iżykowice, Jakubowice, Januszowice, Jastrzębniki, Ksawerów, Kujawki, Kwaszyn, Lipówka, Marianów, Niewiatrowice, Opatkowice, Pierocice, Podrózie, Sancygniów, Stępocice, Sudół, Świerczyna, Sypów, Szczotkowice, Szyszczyce, Teodorów, Wola Knyszyńska, Wolica, Wymysłów, Zagaje Dębiańskie and Zagórze.

Neighbouring gminas
Gmina Działoszyce is bordered by the gminas of Czarnocin, Książ Wielki, Michałów, Pińczów, Racławice, Skalbmierz, Słaboszów and Wodzisław.

References
Polish official population figures 2006
 Dzialoszyce, Poland, is also where Jewish brothers were saved during World War II as depicted in the 2005 documentary film Hiding And Seeking by Menachem Daum - see PBS POV as via https://www.pbs.org/pov/hidingandseeking/film_description.php

Dzialoszyce
Pińczów County